Back to Soft is the third album by psychedelic rock band Coke Weed. It was released on July 23, 2013. The album was self-produced and mixed by Nick Stumpf.

Reception

Track listing

Personnel
Coke Weed
Nina Donghia - vocals
Milan McAlevey - guitar, vocals
Caleb Davis - guitar, backing vocals
Zach Soares - bass
Peter Cuffari - drums, and percussion

References

2013 albums
Coke Weed albums